Adam Hayward (born June 23, 1984) is a former American football linebacker. He was drafted by the Tampa Bay Buccaneers in the sixth round of the 2007 NFL Draft. He played college football at Portland State.

Early life
A linebacker at Marina High School, Adam was unnerved by the idea of playing the position of Safety for Colorado State University, He took a year off from football at Colorado to take care of some family issues. Eventually, he found his place starting as an outside linebacker for Portland State University under Tim Walsh.

Professional career

Tampa Bay Buccaneers
Hayward was drafted by the Tampa Bay Buccaneers in the sixth round (184th pick) of the 2007 NFL Draft.

Washington Redskins
On March 10, 2014, Hayward signed a three-year deal with the Washington Redskins. He was placed on injured reserve due to a tibial plateau fracture in his right leg on November 24. He suffered the fracture after jumping to catch the ball during a punt in the Week 12 game against the San Francisco 49ers.

Hayward tore one of his ACLs in the second 2015 preseason games against the Detroit Lions. On August 22, 2015, the Redskins placed him on injured reserve for the second time in a row.

Hayward was released on July 22, 2016.

References

External links
Washington Redskins bio
Tampa Bay Buccaneers bio

1984 births
Living people
American football linebackers
Portland State Vikings football players
Tampa Bay Buccaneers players
Washington Redskins players